The Kacheguda–Mysuru Express is a Express train belonging to South Central Railway zone that runs between  and Mysuru in India. It is currently being operated with 12785/12786 train numbers on a daily basis.

Service

12785/Kacheguda–Mysuru Superfast Express has an average speed of 55 km/hr and covers 764 km in 14h 35m.
12786/Mysuru–Kacheguda Superfast Express has an average speed of 55 km/hr and covers 764 km in 14h 55m.

It is extended to Mysore since 04-03-2019.

Route and halts 

The important halts of the train are:

 
 Jadcherla
 
 Gadwal Junction
 
 
 
 
 
 
 
 Gauribidanur
 Doddaballapur
 
 
 
 
 
 Ramanagaram
 Mandya

Coach composition

The train has standard ICF rakes with max speed of 110 kmph. The train consists of 24 coaches:

 1 First AC and Second AC
 2 AC II Tier
 4 AC III Tier
 12 Sleeper coaches
 3 General Unreserved
 2 Seating cum Luggage Rake

Traction

Both trains are hauled by a Krishnarajapuram Loco Shed-based twin WDM-3A diesel locomotive from Kacheguda to Mysuru, and vice versa.

See also 

 Kacheguda railway station
 Bangalore City railway station
 Mysore Junction railway station

Notes

References

External links 

 12785/Kacheguda–Mysuru SF Express (PT) India Rail Info
 12786/Mysuru–Kacheguda SF Express (PT) India Rail Info
 South Central Railway

Transport in Hyderabad, India
Transport in Bangalore
Express trains in India
Rail transport in Telangana
Rail transport in Andhra Pradesh
Rail transport in Karnataka
Railway services introduced in 1975